Ideologia is a 1988 album recorded by Cazuza, the third in his solo career. It won the Prêmio Sharp for best album in 1988 and sold more than 2 million copies.
Many of Cazuza's hits are from this album, such as "Ideologia", "Brasil" and "Faz Parte do Meu Show".

The album cover tried to create some controversy. It mixes swastika and star of David. It is a picture taken by Flavio Colker of an art work by Barrão, who gathered objects found in São Conrado Beach following a reinstorm and some illustrations.

Ideologia is considered one of the main albums in Cazuza's solo career as it is the first recording in which the singer tells about his relation with AIDS and death, as it was his first album after the discovery that he was infected with HIV virus.

The opening and title track "Ideologia" was voted by the Brazilian edition of Rolling Stone to be the 83rd-greatest Brazilian song.

Track listing

References

1988 albums
Cazuza albums